The Foundation for Women's Health, Research and Development (FORWARD) is a British NGO, founded in 1983 by Efua Dorkenoo, that supports women who have experienced female genital mutilation (FGM) and tries to eliminate the practice.<ref>"Efua Dorkenoo" , Equality Now.</ref>

History
FORWARD evolved from the Women’s Action Group for Female Excision and Infibulation (WAGFEI), which comprised UK-based women concerned about FGM. Efua Dorkenoo coordinated the group between 1981 and 1983 under the auspices of the Minority Rights Group (MRG), and travelled to gather facts about FGM from various countries in Africa to compile into an MRG report on the practice.

The organization runs several programmes in the UK and in East and West Africa. According to FORWARD, there are around 100,000 women in the UK who have experienced FGM. The Executive Director is Naana Otoo-Oyortey.

See also
Comfort Momoh
FGM in the UKMy Body My Rules'', a short film about female genital mutilation, developed by FORWARD

Notes

Further reading
FORWARD, The Foundation for Women's Health, Research and Development, accessed 11 September 2011.
"Hospitals and Clinics in the UK offering Specialist FGM (Female Genital Mutilation) Services" , FORWARD, accessed 11 September 2011.
"'Harmful' tradition continues in Britain", BBC News, 22 November 2000.
'UK's FGM safeguarding policies undermining welfare, study warns', The Guardian, 4 February 2021. 

Female genital mutilation
Health charities in the United Kingdom